Josef Muigg (born 27 July 1960) is an Austrian bobsledder. He competed in the four man event at the 1988 Winter Olympics.

References

1960 births
Living people
Austrian male bobsledders
Olympic bobsledders of Austria
Bobsledders at the 1988 Winter Olympics
Sportspeople from Tyrol (state)